Faunces Mountain is a mountain in Barnstable County, Massachusetts. Flatrock Hill is located west of Faunces Mountain.

References

Mountains of Massachusetts
Mountains of Barnstable County, Massachusetts